Ranking taken from the AP Poll

References

San Diego State Aztecs

San Diego State bowl games
San Diego State Aztecs
San Diego State Aztecs bowl games